Margarita Borisovna Rudenko (in Russian: Маргарита Борисовна Руденко; 9 May 1926 in Tiflis – 27 July 1976 in Leningrad) was a Russian philologist, Orientalist, Kurdologist (specialist in Kurdish language, culture and history), literature researcher and ethnographist. She received her Doctor of Sciences degree in 1954.

Publications
 Opisanie kurdskikh rukopiseĭ leningradskikh sobraniĭ, 1961
 Kurdskie narodnye skazki, 1970
 Kurdskaja obrjadovaja poėzija : pochoronnye pričitanija, 1982
 Literaturnai︠a︡ i folʹklornye versii kurdskoĭ poėmy "I︠U︡suf i Zelikha", 1986

References 
  Ж. С. Мусаэлян. Маргарита Борисовна Руденко (статья для сайта Санкт-Петербургского Института восточных рукописей Российской Академии Наук, 2001)

1926 births
1976 deaths
Russian orientalists
20th-century Russian non-fiction writers
20th-century Russian women writers